"Sink N' Swim" is a single from Plumb's studio album Beautiful Lumps of Coal. The song was released both digitally and physically.

Track listing
"Sink N' Swim" - 3:29
"Damaged" - 3:56

Music videos
Two music videos were released for the song. One shows Plumb in a purple dress walking down a street alley surrounded by people. The second version, available on the WOW Hits 2004 DVD, shows Plumb in a black dress, standing in front of a microphone in a small room by herself.

Chart performance

2004 singles
Plumb (singer) songs
2003 songs
Curb Records singles